The 1970-71 NBA season was the Bulls' 5th season in the NBA.

Offseason

Draft picks

Roster

Regular season

Season standings

z – clinched division title
y – clinched division title
x – clinched playoff spot

Record vs. opponents

Game log

Playoffs

|- align="center" bgcolor="#ffcccc"
| 1
| March 24
| @ Los Angeles
| L 99–100
| Bob Love (24)
| Sloan, Boerwinkle (9)
| Tom Boerwinkle (8)
| The Forum10,726
| 0–1
|- align="center" bgcolor="#ffcccc"
| 2
| March 26
| @ Los Angeles
| L 95–105
| Bob Love (34)
| Jim Fox (13)
| Bob Weiss (5)
| The Forum13,469
| 0–2
|- align="center" bgcolor="#ccffcc"
| 3
| March 28
| Los Angeles
| W 106–98
| Bob Love (27)
| Chet Walker (12)
| Bob Weiss (11)
| Chicago Stadium10,101
| 1–2
|- align="center" bgcolor="#ccffcc"
| 4
| March 30
| Los Angeles
| W 112–102
| Bob Love (36)
| Jerry Sloan (12)
| Bob Weiss (13)
| Chicago Stadium18,650
| 2–2
|- align="center" bgcolor="#ffcccc"
| 5
| April 1
| @ Los Angeles
| L 89–115
| Bob Love (21)
| Jim Fox (11)
| Weiss, King (7)
| The Forum13,935
| 2–3
|- align="center" bgcolor="#ccffcc"
| 6
| April 4
| Los Angeles
| W 113–99
| Bob Weiss (25)
| Tom Boerwinkle (18)
| Boerwinkle, Walker (6)
| Chicago Stadium14,211
| 3–3
|- align="center" bgcolor="#ffcccc"
| 7
| April 6
| @ Los Angeles
| L 98–109
| Sloan, Love (24)
| Jim Fox (12)
| Bob Weiss (8)
| The Forum17,505
| 3–4
|-

Awards and records
Dick Motta, NBA Coach of the Year Award
Bob Love, All-NBA Second Team
Jerry Sloan, NBA All-Defensive Second Team
Chet Walker, NBA All-Star Game
Bob Love, NBA All-Star Game

References

Chicago
Chicago Bulls seasons
Chicago Bulls
Chicago Bulls